Thomas Horner may refer to:

 Thomas Horner (armourer), character (an armorer) in Henry VI, Part 2
 Thomas Horner (Mells Manor), man connected to Little Jack Horner
 Thomas Strangways Horner, English MP for Somerset in 1713 and 1727
 Thomas Hornor (surveyor) (1785–1844)